Nat Geo Music is a television music channel operated as a part of National Geographic Global Networks, which is a business unit of National Geographic Partners (a joint venture between The Walt Disney Company and the National Geographic Society). The channel works in conjunction with the Society's music division National Geographic Music and Radio (NGMR).

Launch and availability
C21 reported in July 2007 that National Geographic Channels International (NGCI; now National Geographic Global Networks) would launch a Nat Geo Music channel in October in Italy before a staged roll out across Europe.

In mid-August 2007, NGCI confirmed the channel and its Italy launch date of 15 October 2007 on Sky. NGCI has arranged for music from the following labels: EMI Arabia, Sony/BMG Asia, Warner Music Latin America  and Universal Italy, for the channel. The channel was launched in Latin America in the fourth quarter 2008. The Saturday before March 3, 2009, the channel and Nat Geo Wild was launched in Portugal on the Cabovisão and Meo platforms.

Nat Geo Music was slated to be launched in 2008 with three other Nat Geo channels in India. Fox International Channels launched in 2010 the new Nat Geo channels again along with three other Fox channels On 1 February 2010, Nat Geo Music and two channels from Fox debuted on Singaporean cable TV provider StarHub.

Content 
Previously, Nat Geo Music aired documentaries regarding 'culture and music' around the world, later they began to play music around the clock without channel identification, promos and advertisements (though it plays the same music then).

See also
 National Geographic Channel

References

Disney television networks
Music television channels
Television channels and stations established in 2007
Italian-language television stations
Television channels in Italy
Cable television in Hong Kong
Music
Defunct television channels in India
Disney Star